Thomas Waite (born 11 March 1972, in Belfast) is a Northern Irish former professional boxer who competed from 1996 to 2001. He held the BUI Ireland National title in 1997 and the British and Commonwealth bantamweight titles in 2000.

References

External links
 

1972 births
Bantamweight boxers
Living people
Male boxers from Northern Ireland
Boxers from Belfast
Super-bantamweight boxers
Irish male boxers